Primera División A (Méxican First A Division) 1995-96 was a Mexican football tournament. This was the second tournament played. 16 clubs played the tournament in order to earn promotion to the first division at the end of the tournament Pachuca earn the Promotion and Tepic was relegated to the Second Division.

Changes from the previous season
16 teams participated in the tournament.
Correcaminos UAT was relegated from the First Division.
Gallos Blancos TM was relegated from the First Division, in the preseason, the team was relocated to Hermosillo and changed its name to Gallos Blancos de Hermosillo.
Cruz Azul Hidalgo was promoted from Second Division.
Aguascalientes was bought by the C.F. Monterrey board and they created a new team called Saltillo Soccer.
UAQ moved to Tampico and renamed Tampico F.C.

Stadium and locations

Group league tables

Group 1

Group 2

Group 3

Group 4

General league table

Liguilla

Group A

Group B

Final round

Semi-finals

Final

Regular season

Relegation table

References

2
Ascenso MX seasons
1995–96 domestic association football leagues